Carla Cardona (born Carla Denise Cardona González on May 10, 1987, in Cananea, Mexico) is a Mexican model, actress and former beauty pageant titleholder . Career began after winning the contest Nuestra Belleza Sonora 2007.

Biography 
Cardona was on May 10, 1987, in Cananea, Sonora, Mexico. After winning the contest Nuestra Belleza Sonora 2007, she graduated from the CEA of Televisa. In 2009 played in Camaleones as Mercedes Márquez. In 2012 she had a special participation in Por ella soy Eva and also participated in the new production of Mapat L. de Zatarain, titled La mujer del Vendaval. She also acted as Maestra Eloisa in La rosa de Guadalupe in 2012.

In 2015 she was summoned for the telenovela Antes muerta que Lichita. In 2016 has a special participation in the telenovela Corazón que miente. The following year, in 2017, she was given a starring role in the telenovela Mi adorable maldición and the films La Jaula and El que busca, encuentra.

Filmography

References

External links 
 

1987 births
Living people
Mexican telenovela actresses
Mexican television actresses
Mexican film actresses
Mexican female models
Actresses from Sonora
21st-century Mexican actresses
People from Cananea